Pineforest Crunch is a Swedish pop music band based in Solna. They have released three albums and toured extensively internationally selling over 250 000 albums worldwide. Their music is highly textured and often features the use of unusual musical instruments to complement the overall sound. Members include Åsa Eklund on vocals and flute, Mats Lundgren  on bass guitar, mellotron, and keyboards, Olle Söderström  on guitar and vocals, and Mattias Olsson on drums and percussion.

Discography 
Albums
 Make Believe (1996)
 Water Garden (1997)
 Panamarenko (2002)

Singles
 "Cup Noodle Song" (1996 single)
 "Teenage Alex" (1996)
 "Shangri-la" (1997)
 "Innocent" (2000)
 "College Radio Listeners''

See also 
 Polar Music

External links 
 Official website
 Exergy Music (Swedish)
 RateYourMusic - Pineforest Crunch
  Mattias Olssons Studio

Swedish pop music groups